Alimirza Ostovari  is an Iranian football midfielder who played for Iran in the 1996 Asian Cup. He also played for Bargh Shiraz.

Honours

Club
Azadegan League
Winner: 1
Esteghlal
Hazfi Cup
Runner up: 1
Esteghlal

References

External links

Teammelii.com

Iran international footballers
Iranian footballers
Bargh Shiraz players
FC Admira Wacker Mödling players
Esteghlal F.C. players
Pas players
Paykan F.C. players
1973 births
Living people
Iranian expatriate footballers
Expatriate footballers in Austria
Association football midfielders
Place of birth missing (living people)